Miljacka Hydroelectric Power Plant is a hydroelectric power plant on the river Krka, located in Šibenik-Knin County, in central Dalmatia, Croatia.

The Miljacka Hydroelectric Power Plant, formerly called Manojlovac, is a relatively small high-pressure diversion power plant. It is one of the oldest in Croatia. It was built in 1906 on the Krka River, some 15 km downstream from the town of Knin. The power plant capacity in the beginning was 17.7 MW, and it supplied the power to the calcium carbide factory in Šibenik.

It is operated by Hrvatska elektroprivreda.

The Krka River catchment Hydropower structures
Golubić Hydroelectric Power Plant
Small Krčić Hydroelectric Power Plant
Miljacka Hydroelectric Power Plant
Roški Slap Hydroelectric Power Plant
Jaruga Hydroelectric Power Plant

See also

Krka
Knin
Oklaj

References

External links
http://www.gradimo.hr/2041.aspx

Hydroelectric power stations in Croatia
Buildings and structures in Šibenik-Knin County